The International Rink Hockey Committee or Comité Internationale de Rink-Hockey or CIRH was a sports governing body within the Fédération Internationale de Roller Sports designed to organize rules and competitions for the sport rink hockey.

External links
CIRH website
CIRH old website

Roller hockey
International sports organizations